The 2010–11 División de Honor Juvenil de Fútbol season was the 25th since its establishment. Barcelona was the champion.

Regular season

Group 1

Group 2

Group 3

Group 4

Group 5

Group 6

Group 7

Copa de Campeones

Group A

Table

Results

Group B

1st round

2nd round

Final

Details

See also
2011 Copa del Rey Juvenil

External links
Group 1 at futbolme.com
Group 2 at futbolme.com
Group 3 at futbolme.com
Group 4 at futbolme.com
Group 5 at futbolme.com
Group 6 at futbolme.com
Group 7 at futbolme.com

División de Honor Juvenil de Fútbol seasons
Juvenil